Acarospora contigua is a species of saxicolous (rock-dwelling), crustose lichen in the family Acarosporaceae. It was formally described as a new species in 1929 by Swedish lichenologist Adolf Hugo Magnusson. The dark yellow thallus has a continuous smooth crust comprising  that are 1–2.5 mm in diameter. In North America, it is known as the gold cobblestone lichen.

References

contigua
Lichen species
Lichens described in 1929
Lichens of North America
Lichens of India